Elsie Albiin (17 December 1921 – 3 April 2009) was a Swedish actress born in Helsingborg. She appeared in several films, including 1953's Intimate Relations. She was a widow for the last eleven years of her life. Her husband was Tony Ford.
She lived in Lyngby, close to her children's family.

Selected filmography 
 Med dej i mina armar (1940)
 Fransson the Terrible (1941)
 Lärarinna på vift (1941)
 Nothing Is Forgotten (1942)
 Lyckan kommer (1942)
 Sonja (1943)
 Imprisoned Women (1943)
 His Excellency (1944)
 En dag skall gry (1944)
 Fram för lilla Märta (1945)
 Crime and Punishment (1945)
 The Bells of the Old Town (1946)
 Harald the Stalwart (1946)
 Incorrigible (1946)
 Rapture (1950)
 The Nuthouse (1951)
 The Long Search (1952) (UK: Memory of Love)
 Intimate Relations (1953)
 36 Hours (US: Terror Street) (1953)
 Hidden Fear (1957)

References

Further reading

External links

1921 births
2009 deaths
People from Helsingborg
Swedish stage actresses
Swedish film actresses
Swedish expatriates in Denmark
People from Kongens Lyngby